The Convention on International Transport of Goods Under Cover of TIR Carnets (TIR Convention) is a multilateral treaty that was concluded at Geneva on 14 November 1975 to simplify and harmonise the administrative formalities of international road transport. (TIR stands for "Transports Internationaux Routiers" or "International Road Transports".) The 1975 convention replaced the TIR Convention of 1959, which itself replaced the 1949 TIR Agreement between a number of European countries. The conventions were adopted under the auspices of the United Nations Economic Commission for Europe (UNECE). As of December 2020, there are 77 parties to the Convention, including 76 states and the European Union.

The TIR Convention establishes an international customs transit system with maximum facility to move goods:
 in sealed vehicles or containers;
 from a customs office of departure in one country to a customs office of destination in another country;
 without requiring extensive and time-consuming border checks at intermediate borders;
 while, at the same time, providing customs authorities with the required security and guarantees.

The TIR system not only covers customs transit by road but a combination is possible with other modes of transport (e.g., rail, inland waterway, and even maritime transport), as long as at least one part of the total transport is made by road.

To date, more than 33,000 international transport operators had been authorised (by their respective competent national authorities) to access the TIR system, using around 1.5 million TIR carnets per year.

In light of the expected increase in world trade, further enlargement of its geographical scope and the forthcoming introduction of an electronic TIR system (so-called "eTIR-system"), it is expected that the TIR system will continue to remain the only truly global customs transit system.

Due to the large blue-and-white TIR plates carried by vehicles using the TIR convention, the word "TIR" entered many languages, such as Italian, Polish, Portuguese, Romanian or Turkish, as a neologism, becoming the default generic name of a large lorry.

Saudi Arabia acceded to the convention on 17 May 2018, and the convention entered into force for Saudi Arabia on 17 November 2018. Egypt acceded to the convention on 16 December 2020, and entered into force in Egypt on 16 June 2021.

With the accession of Saudi Arabia and Egypt, the TIR Convention had seventy-seven Contracting Parties.

TIR procedures 
Lorriers making use of the TIR procedure must first obtain an internationally harmonised customs document, referred to as a TIR carnet. TIR carnets are issued by national road transport associations. This customs document is valid internationally and as well as describing the goods, their shipper and their destination, represents a financial guarantee. When a lorry arrives at a border customs post it need not pay import duties and taxes on goods at that time. Instead the payments are suspended. If the vehicle transits the country without delivering any goods, no taxes are due. If it fails to leave the country with all the goods, then the taxes are billed to the importer and the financial guarantee backstops the importer's obligation to pay the taxes. TIR transits are carried out in bond, i.e. the lorry must be sealed as well as bearing the carnet. The security payment system is administered by the International Road Transport Union (IRU).

The TIR procedure is mostly used with Eastern European countries that are not in the EU (e.g. Russia and Ukraine), Turkey, and parts of the Near East. Since the formation of the European single market, the TIR procedure has become unnecessary for intra-EU goods transport.

As a result of Brexit, TIR carnets could become part of the solution to merchandise traffic between Great Britain and other European countries, or for goods to transit intra-EU, for example between Ireland and mainland Europe.

See also 
CMR Convention
ATA Carnet
Carnet de Passages en Douane

References

External links 
Signatories and ratifications.
 TIR - UNECE

United Nations Economic Commission for Europe treaties
Transport treaties
Customs treaties
Treaties concluded in 1975
International road transport
Treaties entered into force in 1978
Treaties of the Democratic Republic of Afghanistan
Treaties of the People's Socialist Republic of Albania
Treaties of Algeria
Treaties of Argentina
Treaties of Armenia
Treaties of Austria
Treaties of Azerbaijan
Treaties of Belarus
Treaties of Belgium
Treaties of Bosnia and Herzegovina
Treaties of the People's Republic of Bulgaria
Treaties of the People's Republic of China
Treaties of Cyprus
Treaties of Canada
Treaties of Chile
Treaties of Croatia
Treaties of Czechoslovakia
Treaties of the Czech Republic
Treaties of Denmark
Treaties of Egypt
Treaties of Estonia
Treaties entered into by the European Union
Treaties of Finland
Treaties of France
Treaties of West Germany
Treaties of East Germany
Treaties of Greece
Treaties of the Hungarian People's Republic
Treaties of India
Treaties of Indonesia
Treaties of Iran
Treaties of Ireland
Treaties of Israel
Treaties of Italy
Treaties of Jordan
Treaties of Kazakhstan
Treaties of Kuwait
Treaties of Kyrgyzstan
Treaties of Latvia
Treaties of Lebanon
Treaties of Liberia
Treaties of Lithuania
Treaties of Luxembourg
Treaties of Malta
Treaties of Mongolia
Treaties of Montenegro
Treaties of Morocco
Treaties of the Netherlands
Treaties of Norway
Treaties of Oman
Treaties of Pakistan
Treaties of the Polish People's Republic
Treaties of Portugal
Treaties of South Korea
Treaties of Moldova
Treaties of the Socialist Republic of Romania
Treaties of the Soviet Union
Treaties of Serbia and Montenegro
Treaties of Yugoslavia
Treaties of Slovakia
Treaties of Slovenia
Treaties of Spain
Treaties of Sweden
Treaties of Switzerland
Treaties of Syria
Treaties of Tajikistan
Treaties of North Macedonia
Treaties of Tunisia
Treaties of Turkey
Treaties of Turkmenistan
Treaties of Ukraine
Treaties of the United Arab Emirates
Treaties of the United Kingdom
Treaties of the United States
Treaties of Uruguay
Treaties of Uzbekistan
Treaties of Georgia (country)
1975 in Switzerland
Treaties extended to Guernsey
Treaties extended to Jersey
Treaties extended to Gibraltar
Treaties extended to the Isle of Man
Treaties extended to the Faroe Islands
Treaties extended to Greenland
Treaties extended to Aruba
Treaties extended to the Netherlands Antilles
1975 in transport
Treaties extended to West Berlin

sk:Colný dohovor o medzinárodnej preprave tovaru na poklade karnetov TIR